Nicole Loraux (26 April 1943 – 6 April 2003) was a French historian of classical Athens.

Biography
She was born in Paris and died in Argenteuil. She graduated in Classics at the École normale supérieure des filles (1962). In 1965, she obtained the agrégation de lettres classiques (examination equivalent to the Postgraduate Higher Education Teaching Certificate, but more competitive), before writing a PhD thesis under the supervision of Pierre Vidal-Naquet.

Her doctoral thesis Athènes imaginaire. Histoire de l'oraison funèbre athénienne et de sa fonction dans la cité classique (1977) became Loraux's best known work, The Invention of Athens: the Funeral Oration in the Classical City (Cambridge, MA 1986; New York 2006; orig. fr. Paris 1981).

Loraux was influential in the rise of gender as an important category of analysis in ancient Greek history. She has been described as a "preeminent" structuralist historian.  In 2007, a conference was held in Paris to explore Loraux's legacy in feminist and classical scholarship. In 2018, a conference in Strasbourg entitled 'The Athenian Funeral Oration: 40 Years after Nicole Loraux' paid homage to the "huge impact" of Loraux's work on our understanding of the funeral oration's "central part in maintaining Athenian self-identity".

Publications 
 La Tragédie d’Athènes. La politique entre l’ombre et l’utopie, Seuil, 2005
 La Cité divisée. L’oubli dans la mémoire d’Athènes, Paris, Payot, coll. « Petite Bibliothèque Payot », 2005 
 (dir.), (it) Grecia al femminile, Roma-Bari, Gius. Laterza & Figli, 1993 ; (fr) La Grèce au féminin, traduction française des articles en italien par Hélène Monsacré, Belles Lettres, coll. « Histoire », 2003 
 avec Carles Miralles (dir.), Figures de l’intellectuel en Grèce ancienne, Belin, 2000
 La Voix endeuillée. Essai sur la tragédie grecque, Gallimard, 1999
 Né de la terre. Mythe et politique à Athènes, Paris, Seuil, coll. « La Librairie du xxe siècle» , 1996 
 La Cité divisée. Critique de la politique, Payot, 1997
 L’Invention d’Athènes. Histoire de l’oraison funèbre dans la « cité classique », Paris/La Haye,  éd. de l’EHESS/Mouton, 1981; nouvelle éd., nouvelle préface, Payot, 1993
 Qu’est-ce qu’une déesse dans Histoire des femmes en Occident I, Plon, 1991
 Les Enfants d’Athéna. Idées athéniennes sur la citoyenneté et la division des sexes, Paris, Maspero, 1981  ;  éd. augmentée d'une postface, Seuil, coll. « Points/Essais », 1990 
 Les Mères en deuil, Paris, Seuil, 1990
 Les Expériences de Tirésias. Le féminin et l’homme grec, Paris, Gallimard, NRF Essais, 1990
 Façons tragiques de tuer une femme, Paris, Hachette, 1985

English translations 
 The invention of Athens: the funeral oration in the classical city, New York, Zone Books, 2006 ; Cambridge, M.A., Harvard University Press, 1986 
 The divided city: on memory and forgetting in ancient Athens, New York, Zone Books, 2002 
 The mourning voice: an essay on Greek tragedy, Ithaca, N.Y., Cornell University Press, 2002 .
 Born of the earth: myth and politics in Athens, Ithaca, N.Y., Cornell University Press, 2000 
 Mothers in mourning: with the essay, Of amnesty and its opposite, Ithaca, N.Y., Cornell University Press, 1998 
 The experiences of Tiresias: the feminine and the Greek man, Princeton, N.J., Princeton University Press, 1995 
 The children of Athena: Athenian ideas about citizenship and the division between the sexes, Princeton, N.J., Princeton University Press, 1993 
 “What is a Goddess?” in A History of Women, Volume I: From Ancient Goddesses to Christian Saints, ed. Pauline Schmitt Pantel, Cambridge, M.A., Belknap Press of Harvard University Press, 1992, 11–44, orig. it. Roma-Bari 1990 
 Tragic ways of killing a woman, Cambridge, M.A., Harvard University Press, 1987

References

1943 births
2003 deaths
Writers from Paris
20th-century French translators
Scholars of ancient Greek history